Lexington Heights is a neighborhood in Pasadena, California. It is bordered by Atchison Street (northern city limit) to the north, Washington Boulevard to the south, Lake Avenue to the west, and Hill Avenue to the east.

Landmarks
There is some commercial development on Lake Avenue and Washington Boulevard, but for the most part Lexington Heights is a residential neighborhood.

Education
Lexington Heights is home to Longfellow Elementary School, and is also served by Burbank Elementary School, Eliot Middle School, and Pasadena High School.

Transportation
Lexington Heights is served by Metro Local lines 256 and 662; as well as Pasadena Transit routes 20 31, and 32.

Neighborhoods in Pasadena, California